The Battle of Bensington was a major battle fought between Mercia, led by King Offa, and the West Saxons led by Cynewulf of Wessex. It ended with a victory for the Mercians, and the West Saxons recognizing Mercian overlordship.

Nearly nothing is known about the battle except that the Mercians defeated the West Saxons.

The reference in the Anglo-Saxon Chronicle is succinct. It simply reads:

"777 [actually 779] Her Cynewulf & Offa gefuhton ymb Benesingtun & Offa nam þone tuun".

(This year Cynewulf and Offa fought near Bensington and Offa took the town.)

References 

Bensington
Bensington
Bensington
779
8th century in England